East Hastings Pharmacy is a Canadian docufiction film, directed by Antoine Bourges and released in 2012. The film is a portrait of a methadone clinic for drug addicts in the East Hastings neighbourhood of Vancouver, British Columbia, scripted and performed through an improvisational process with various real-life drug addicts, with professional actress Shauna Hansen playing the role of the pharmacist.

The film premiered in March 2012 at the Cinéma du Réel film festival.

It was the winner of the Colin Low Award for Best Canadian Documentary at the 2013 DOXA Documentary Film Festival, and cowinner with Rodrigo Barriuso's For Dorian of the Lindalee Tracey Award at the 2013 Hot Docs Canadian International Documentary Festival.

References

External links

2012 films
2012 drama films
2012 documentary films
Canadian docufiction films
Films set in Vancouver
Films shot in Vancouver
2010s Canadian films
Films directed by Antoine Bourges